Ran Cohen (born 20 June 1937) is an Israeli politician and former Knesset member for Meretz.

Background
Born Said Cohen in Baghdad, Iraq, Cohen was 13 years old when he immigrated to Israel through Iran. He hebraized his first name after his arrival in Israel, renaming himself "Ran". He grew up in Kibbutz Gan Shmuel, where he absorbed Socialist and Zionist ideologies. During his military service he rose to the rank of colonel (Aluf Mishne). After the military he obtained a B.A. in philosophy and Economics at Tel Aviv University.

Cohen is a resident of Mevaseret Zion. He is married and has four children.

Political career
In 1970 he was elected as Secretary of Kibbutz Gan Shmuel.

In 1984 he was first elected to the Knesset as a member of Ratz (headed by Shulamit Aloni) after he headed the Left Camp of Israel peace movement.

Starting in 1992, he served as a member of Meretz, a dovish left wing party which resulted from the merger of Mapam, Ratz and Shinui. He was Minister of Industry and Trade in Ehud Barak's government. He headed several Knesset committees, including the Security and Foreign Affairs committee.

Cohen is most identified with "Law of Public Housing", which allowed residents of houses supplied by the state to assume ownership on the house. He also managed to pass a law regulating minimum wages.

Cohen's political focus is on social-economic issues rather than foreign policy and the Israeli-Palestinian peace process.

After Meretz merged with Yossi Beilin's Shachar movement and renamed itself Yachad in 2004, Cohen ran for the chairmanship of the new party, but lost to Beilin. Supporters of Cohen blamed his defeat on anti-Mizrahi racism within the party and pointed out that he was the only non-Ashkenazi to reach a senior position within it. 

On 1 November 2008, following Beilin's resignation, he announced his intention to retire from political life and not to seek a spot on the party's list ahead of the upcoming general elections. He said "I want to start chapter three of my life, to do things for my soul: writing, lecturing, taking part in social and public initiatives that interest me".

Career
As of 2011, Ran Cohen is the Chairman of the Standards Institute of Israel (SII).

References

External links

 Standards Institute of Israel

1937 births
Living people
Iraqi Jews
People from Baghdad
Iraqi refugees
Iraqi emigrants to Israel
Israeli Mizrahi Jews
Israeli people of Iraqi-Jewish descent
Tel Aviv University alumni
Meretz politicians
Ratz (political party) politicians
Kibbutzniks
Members of the 11th Knesset (1984–1988)
Members of the 12th Knesset (1988–1992)
Members of the 13th Knesset (1992–1996)
Members of the 14th Knesset (1996–1999)
Members of the 15th Knesset (1999–2003)
Members of the 16th Knesset (2003–2006)
Members of the 17th Knesset (2006–2009)
Deputy ministers of Israel
People from Mevaseret Zion